Numerous non-native plants have been introduced to Maryland in the United States and many of them have become invasive species. The following is a list of some non-native invasive plant species established in Maryland.

Terrestrial plants

Aquatic plants

See also
Invasive species in the United States

References

External links
Invasive Plants in Maryland. University of Maryland Extension, Home and Garden Information Center.
Maryland: Commonly Planted Invasive Plants. Maryland Department of Natural Resources, Wildlife and Heritage Service.
marylandbiodiversity.com Maryland Biodiversity Project.
mdinvasivesp.org Maryland Invasive Species Council.
invasivespecies.gov United States Government.

Flora of Maryland
Natural history of Maryland
Invasive
Environment of Maryland
Maryland